Carol Huynh (born 16 November 1980) is a retired Canadian freestyle wrestler. Huynh was the first gold medalist for Canada in women's wrestling and was the first gold medallist for Canada at the 2008 Beijing Olympics. She is also the 2010 Commonwealth Games and two time Pan American Games champion. She has also achieved success at the world championships where Huynh has totaled one silver and three bronze medals. Huynh is also an eleven time national champion. Following the 2012 Olympics, Huynh retired from competition and started coaching the University of Calgary Dinos wrestling team. Huynh was elected to the United World Wrestling Hall of Fame in 2013. In early 2015 she was selected as a United World Wrestling Super 8 Ambassador for the global campaign focusing on the development of women in wrestling and has also served as the Chair of the United World Wrestling Athletes Commission from 2013 to 2017. As of 2020 she is the current coach of Wrestling Canada's Next Gen team based in Calgary.

Career
Huynh broke onto the international scene as a wrestler beginning at the World Championships in 2000 where she won bronze. She continued to build on this success at the next World Championships in 2001 where she won silver. She would have to wait four more years till she would medal again at the Worlds when she won a bronze again in 2005. Success never dropped off though, Huynh would win the title in her 48 kg weight class at the 2007 Pan American Games.

She competed in the 48 kg weight class at the 2008 Summer Olympics, winning a gold medal. This broke Canada's gold medal drought at the 2008 Games. She is the second ever female medallist for Canada in Olympic wrestling, after Tonya Verbeek, the 2004 Athens freestyle silver medallist. Huynh was the first gold medallist in women's wrestling for Canada.

Following the Olympic games she continued to perform at a top level, winning bronze at the 2010 World Championships. That same year she won the Commonwealth Games title. Huynh then won the 2011 Canadian title again for 48 kg and then successfully defended her Pan Am Games title in Guadalajara. She was named to the 2012 Summer Olympics team in London for Canada. There she won a second Olympic medal, this time a bronze in the 48 kg class.

Coaching and leadership
In 2013, after retiring from competitive wrestling and being inducted to the FILA (renamed in 2014 as United World Wrestling) Hall of Fame, she was appointed as a chairwoman to the international wrestling federation. On 8 December 2015, Huynh was named Canada's assistant chef de mission for Rio Olympics. She was inducted into the Canada's Sports Hall of Fame in 2017. Since 2015 and as of December 2020, Huynh has served as Wrestling Canada's Next Gen coach based out of Calgary.

Personal
Huynh was born in British Columbia to parents who were ethnic Chinese refugees from northern Vietnam.  Her father was born in China, but moved to Vietnam when he was three; her mother was born in Vietnam. They settled in the town of New Hazelton, British Columbia, after being sponsored by the local United Church. Coming from a wrestling family, where both of her sisters wrestled, she started wrestling at 15. She started studies at Simon Fraser University in 1998, then moved to the University of Calgary in 2007. Huynh married Dan Biggs, a social worker and former wrestler, in 2005. She was coached by Paul Ragusa, former National team member and Olympian, as well as Leigh Vierling, ex-husband of former World Champion Christine Nordhagen.

Competitive record

See also
 Wrestling in Canada
 Canadian Interuniversity Sport
 National Association of Intercollegiate Athletics

References

External links
 
 

1980 births
Living people
Canadian sportspeople of Chinese descent
Canadian people of Vietnamese descent
Commonwealth Games gold medallists for Canada
Olympic bronze medalists for Canada
Olympic gold medalists for Canada
Olympic medalists in wrestling
Olympic wrestlers of Canada
People from the Regional District of Kitimat–Stikine
Sportspeople from British Columbia
Wrestlers at the 2007 Pan American Games
Wrestlers at the 2008 Summer Olympics
Wrestlers at the 2011 Pan American Games
Wrestlers at the 2012 Summer Olympics
Medalists at the 2012 Summer Olympics
Medalists at the 2008 Summer Olympics
Canadian female sport wrestlers
World Wrestling Championships medalists
Pan American Games gold medalists for Canada
Commonwealth Games medallists in wrestling
Pan American Games medalists in wrestling
Universiade medalists in wrestling
Wrestlers at the 2010 Commonwealth Games
Universiade gold medalists for Canada
Medalists at the 2005 Summer Universiade
Medalists at the 2007 Pan American Games
Medalists at the 2011 Pan American Games
Medallists at the 2010 Commonwealth Games